Bobby Ray is an American singer-songwriter, vocalist, entertainer based out of Houston, Texas. He spent many years working in the Austin, Texas live music community and is now located just outside Houston, Texas entertaining live for the Southeast Texas music scene in a variety of music styles including Country, Blues, Gospel, Rock, R & B, Contemporary Adult hits, and more. Bobby Ray raises awareness of the ongoing need to support the fighting men and women of the US Military and has donated time performing to support their cause.

Bobby Ray was born in San Diego, California, United States, and moved to Austin, Texas in 1987 to pursue a college degree. His music career began not long after when he was asked by a friend to help him sing at a VFW hall. He has appeared on numerous radio & television commercials, and has played in popular regional bands such as Rain Dance, The Fury, country western band Shilo, blues band Blue Sun Rising, Mojave, among others mostly in the Central Texas area in and around the popular Austin live music scene.

Bobby Ray has played alongside, worked with, or opened for many well known Texas based musicians including Gary P. Nunn, Red Volkert (guitarist for Merle Haggard), John Inmon (former guitarist for Jerry Jeff Walker), Rick McRae (acoustical guitarist for George Strait), Glen Fukunaga (often plays with Bonnie Raitt while touring in Texas), Fred Krc (drummer for Asleep at the Wheel), Shawn Curtis (who sang for The Stylistics in the 70's), among other notable musicians who play in and around the Texas concert circuit.

With production assistance from Triple Strand Productions, two of Bobby Ray's songs " Whiskeyville" and "It's A Friday Night" have recently been featured on international FM radio stations throughout Europe. His music has also been featured on Texas radio stations in Brenham, Conroe, Fairfield, and Fredericksburg as well as numerous internet radio sites that play popular Texas based music.

2008 found Bobby Ray's song "Welcome To Lonelyville" charting in Europe on the European Country Music Association's (ECMA) airplay list in July 2008.

References

External links
 European Country Music Association
 Artist Page at MP3.com
 Artist Page at Austin Music Download
 Artist Page at Tune Flow
 Fan Club Page at Our Stage.com
 Bobby Ray's Official website

American male singer-songwriters
American country singer-songwriters
Country musicians from Texas
Country musicians from California
Musicians from San Diego
Musicians from Houston
Living people
Year of birth missing (living people)
Singer-songwriters from Texas
Singer-songwriters from California